Critical Sociology is a peer-reviewed academic journal that publishes papers six times a year in the field of Sociology. The journal's editor is David Fasenfest (Wayne State University). It has been in publication since 1969 and is currently published by SAGE Publications. In the past, it has been published by Brill Publishers. According to the Journal Citation Reports, the journal has a 2018 impact factor of 1.507, ranking it 67th out of 150 journals in the category "Sociology".

Scope 
Critical Sociology aims to encourage critical thinking by publishing articles from all perspectives defined as falling within the boundaries of critical or radical social science. The journal publishes work which explores the relationship between race, gender and class. Critical Sociology also provides a forum for the discussion of research and findings.

History 
Critical Sociology was established in 1969, originally under the name of The Insurgent Sociologist. It emerged from radical agitation within the American Sociology Association in the wake of the '68 radical movement. Since then the journal has become a key pole of radical and critical research in the social sciences.

Abstracting and indexing 
Critical Sociology is abstracted and indexed in the following databases:
 Social Sciences Citation Index
 Criminal Justice Abstracts
 Educational Research Abstracts Online
 International Bibliography of the Social Sciences
 SCOPUS
 Studies on Women and Gender Abstracts
 The Philosopher's Index
 Criminal Justice Abstracts
 International Political Science Abstracts
 CSA Worldwide Political Science Abstracts

References

External links 
 

SAGE Publishing academic journals
English-language journals
Sociology journals
Publications established in 1969
Bimonthly journals
Critical theory